"The Unreconstructed M" is a science fiction novelette by Philip K. Dick, first published in the January 1957 issue of Science Fiction Stories and later in The Minority Report.  The story is in the public domain.  In it, an independent researcher uncovers a plot to falsify evidence in a world where the technology used to solve crimes has advanced.

References

1957 short stories
Short stories by Philip K. Dick